Fuirendal (until 1677: Vindingegård) is a manor house and estate located in Næstved Municipality in southeastern Denmark. It has been owned by members of the Holstein family since 1700.

History

Origins
The estate was originally called Vindingegaard after a long-gone village named Vindinge. It was owned by Thidricus Skællæ in 1387.

1413–1632:Dyre and Dresselberg families
Vindingegaard was owned by the Dyre family in the 15th century. The first member of the family who is known to have owned the estate is Jens (possibly Niels) Jensen Sosadel, who died in 1417. It remained in the family until his great grandson Erik Christoffersen's death in 1554. His widow, Sidsel Mouridsdatter Skave, then owned the estate until her death in 1592.

Vindingegaard was then passed on to their distant relative Niels Andersen Dresselberg. His son Peder Nielsen Dresselberg inherited the estate in 1594 but died the following year, and it was then taken over by his brother Vilhelm Dresselberg. His widow stayed on the estate after his death in 1620. Their son-in-law, Frederik Parsberg, was the last member of the family to own the estate.

1632–1663: Changing owners
Christian IV bought Vindingegaard in 1632 for his illegitimate son Hans Ulrik Gyldenløve, but he never lived there and died just 30 years old in 1756. The estate was then acquired by Grunde Rosenkrantz, a son of the scholar Holger Rosenkrantz. In 1660, he ceded the estate to his brother Jørgen Rosenkrantz.

1663–1700: Fuiren family
In 1663 he sold it to Margrethe Frische, the widow of Jørgen Fuiren. The Fuiren family was a non-noble family of merchants and civil servants that had come to Denmark from Mecklenburg in about 1560. Vindingegaard is thus one of the earliest examples of an estate that passed from noble to non-noble ownership after the introduction of absolutism in 1660. Ved Margrethe Frische's son Thomas Fuiren inherited the estate in 1665. He passed it on to his nephew Diderik Fuiren, who already owned several other estates. He acquired more land and created the Barony of Fuirendal in 1677. Vindingegaard was the seat of the new barony and was renamed Fuirendal. Diderik Fuiren's son of the same name died young without male heirs in 1700, and the barony was therefore passed on to the crown.

1700–present: Holstein-Holsteinborg family

The crown granted Fuirendal to Ulrik Adolf Holstein. He expanded the estate through the acquisition of more land, founding the Countship of Holsteinborg in 1708.

The house was over the next years let out to a widow. It was from 1811 used as a hospital under the name Fuirendalske Hospital, and from 1833 the Fuirendalske Institute.

The Countship of Holsteinborg was dissolved as a result of the adoption of lensafløsningsloven dk in 1919. Much of the land that had previously belonged to Fuirendal also had to be sold. The remains of the estate continued as a farm under Holsteinborgs.

List of owners
 (1387) Thidricus Skællæ
 (1413) Niels/Jens Jensen Dyre
 (1446–1493) Erik Jensen Dyre
 (1493–1509) Christoffer Eriksen Dyre
 (1509–1554) Erik Christoffersen Dyre
 (1554–1592) Sidsel Mouridsdatter Skave, widow Dyre
 (1592–1594) Niels Andersen Dresselberg
 (1594–1595) Peder Nielsen Dresselberg
 (1595–1620) Vilhelm Nielsen Dresselberg
 (1620–1630) Karen Grubbe, widow Dresselberg
 (1630–1632) Frederik Parsberg
 (1632) The Crown
 (1632–1645) Hans Ulrik Gyldenløve
 (1645) Regitze Grubbe, widow Gyldenløve
 (1645–1660) Gunde Rosenkrantz
 (1660–1663) Jørgen Rosenkrantz
 (1663–1665) Margrethe Frische, widow Fuiren
 (1665–1673) Thomas Fuiren
 (1673–1686) Diderik, Baron Fuiren
 (1686–1700) Diderik II, Baron Fuiren
 (1700) The Crown
 (1700–1737) Ulrich Adolph Holstein-Holsteinborg
 (1737–1749) Frederik Conrad Holstein-Holsteinborg
 (1749–1759) Christoph Conrad Holstein-Holsteinborg
 (1759–1760) Cay Joachim Detlev Holstein-Holsteinborg
 (1760–1796) Heinrich Holstein-Holsteinborg
 (1796–1836) Frederik Adolph Holstein-Holsteinborg
 (1836–1892) Ludvig Henrik Carl Herman Holstein-Holsteinborg
 (1892–1922) Frederik Conrad Christian Christoffer Holstein-Holsteinborg
 (1922–1960) Erik Frederik Adolph Joachim Holstein-Holsteinborg
 (1960– ) Ib Holstein-Holsteinborg
 (1981–present) Ulrich Holstein-Holsteinborg

References

External links

 Didrik Fuiren

Listed buildings and structures in Næstved Municipality
Manor houses in Næstved Municipality
Buildings and structures associated with the Dyre family
Buildings and structures associated with the Dresselberg family
Buildings and structures associated with the Holstein family